Boris Konstantinovich Vainshtein (Russian: Бори́с Константи́нович Вайнште́йн, 10 July 1921 – 28 October 1996) was a Russian crystallographer. He headed the Laboratory of Protein Crystallography of the Institute of Crystallography, Russian Academy of Sciences, and was the director of the institute, where he spent the majority of his career.

Vainshtein studied at the Lomonosov Moscow State University and the Institute of Steel.

See also
 Alexei Vasilievich Shubnikov

Bibliography

References

1921 births
1996 deaths
Crystallographers
Russian physical chemists
Members of the Russian Academy of Sciences
Moscow State University alumni